Magnapinna'' sp. C is an undescribed species of bigfin squid known only from a single specimen of  mantle length (ML) collected in the southern Atlantic Ocean and held in the Natural History Museum. 
Description
It is characterised by several morphological features: the proximal tentacles are more slender than arm pair IV, pigmentation is contained in the chromatophores, and "white nodules" are absent from the fins and glandular regions of the proximal tentacles.
TaxonomyMagnapinna sp. C was originally illustrated in The Open Sea in 1956 and identified as Octopodoteuthopsis.

References
Hardy, A. 1956. The Open Sea. Fisher, J.; Gilmour, J.; Huxley, J.; Davies, M. & Hosking E. (eds.), Collins, London. 
Vecchione, M. & Young, R. E. (2006). "The squid family Magnapinnidae (Mollusca; Cephalopoda) in the North Atlantic with a description of Magnapinna atlantica, n. sp.". Proc. Biol. Soc. Wash.'' 119(3): 365-372.

External links
Tree of Life web project: Magnapinna sp. C

Squid
Undescribed mollusc species
Species known from a single specimen